Giant oscillator strength is inherent in excitons that are weakly bound to impurities or defects in crystals.

The spectrum of fundamental absorption of direct-gap semiconductors such as gallium arsenide (GaAs) and cadmium sulfide (CdS) is continuous and corresponds to band-to-band transitions. It begins with transitions at the center of the Brillouin zone, . In a perfect crystal, this spectrum is preceded by a hydrogen-like series of the transitions to s-states of Wannier-Mott excitons. In addition to the exciton lines, there are surprisingly strong additional absorption lines in the same spectral region. They belong to excitons weakly bound to impurities and defects and are termed 'impurity excitons'. Shallow impurity-exciton states are working as antennas borrowing their giant oscillator strength from vast areas of the crystal around them. They were predicted by Emmanuel Rashba first for molecular excitons and afterwards for excitons in semiconductors. Giant oscillator strengths of impurity excitons endow them with ultra-short radiational life-times  ns.

Bound excitons in semiconductors: Theory

Interband optical transitions happen at the scale of the lattice constant which is small compared to the exciton radius. For large excitons  where  is the exciton radius, hence, here  is the unit cell volume.

 .

Coinciding coordinates in the numerator, reflect the fact the exciton is created at a spatial scale small compared with its radius. The integral in the numerator can only be performed for specific models of impurity excitons. This immediately results in an estimate for 

 .

If the exciton is bound to a defect by a weak short-range potential, a more accurate estimate holds

.

Giant oscillator strength for shallow trapped excitons results in their short radiative lifetimes

When quantum yield of radiative emission is high, the process can be considered as resonance fluorescence.

Similar effects exist for optical transitions between exciton and biexciton states.

An alternative description of the same phenomenon is in terms of polaritons: giant cross-sections of the resonance scattering of electronic polaritons on impurities and lattice defects.

Bound excitons in semiconductors: Experiment

In CdS, with  meV, were observed impurity-exciton oscillator strengths . High oscillator strength results in low-power optical saturation and radiative life times  ps. Similarly, radiative life times of about 1 ns were reported for impurity excitons in GaAs. The same mechanism is responsible for short radiative times down to 100 ps for excitons confined in CuCl microcrystallites.

Bound molecular excitons

Similarly, spectra of weakly trapped molecular excitons are also strongly influenced by adjacent exciton bands. It is an important property of typical molecular crystals with two or more symmetrically-equivalent molecules in the elementary cell, such as benzine and naphthalene, that their exciton absorption spectra consist of doublets (or multiplets) of bands strongly polarized along the crystal axes as was demonstrated by Antonina Prikhot'ko. This splitting of strongly polarized absorption bands that originated from the same molecular level and is known as the 'Davydov splitting' is the primary manifestation of molecular excitons. If the low-frequency component of the exciton multiplet is situated at the bottom of the exciton energy spectrum, then the absorption band of an impurity exciton approaching the bottom from below is enhanced in this component of the spectrum and reduced in two other components; in the spectroscopy of molecular excitons this phenomenon is sometimes referred to as the 'Rashba effect'. As a result, the polarization ratio of an impurity exciton band depends on its spectral position and becomes indicative of the energy spectrum of free excitons. In large organic molecules the energy of impurity excitons can be shifted gradually by changing the isotopic content of guest molecules. Building on this option, Vladimir Broude developed a method of studying the energy spectrum of excitons in the host crystal by changing the isotopic content of guest molecules. Interchanging the host and the guest allows studying energy spectrum of excitons from the top. The isotopic technique has been more recently applied to study the energy transport in biological systems.

See also

 Exciton
 Polariton
 Oscillator strength
 Quantum yield
 Resonance fluorescence

References

Condensed matter physics